Ashton Pankey (born May 16, 1992) is an American basketball player who last played for Hapoel Galil Elyon of the Liga Leumit. He was an early entrant for the 2015 NBA Draft.

Pankey attended Archbishop Molloy High School before transferring to St. Anthony High School.

College career
In 2012 Pankey transferred to Manhattan College. He transferred from the Maryland Terrapins. Pankey was the MAAC men's basketball tournament Most Valuable Player for the 2015 tournament. As a senior, Pankey averaged 13.4 points and 6.7 rebounds per game.

Professional career
In September 2015, Pankey signed with Hapoel Galil Elyon in Israel.

Personal life
In 2012 Pankey stated that he left University of Maryland because he wanted to aid his family.

References

External links
Manhattan bio
Ashton Pankey Stats, News, Videos, Highlights, Pictures, Bio - Manhattan Jaspers - ESPN

1992 births
Living people
American men's basketball players
Basketball players from New York City
Archbishop Molloy High School alumni
Manhattan Jaspers basketball players
Maryland Terrapins men's basketball players
Power forwards (basketball)
Sportspeople from the Bronx
St. Anthony High School (New Jersey) alumni